Wheels Suburban Transportation Services is a system of routes owned by New Jersey Transit and operated mostly under contract by private companies primarily in western New Jersey in Hunterdon and western Somerset counties, although some routes operate in urban areas. WHEELS also provided service in Morris and Warren counties, which was eliminated in 2010 because of budget reductions.

Routes

Former routes

All of these routes except 879, 966 and 976 were discontinued after May 28, 2010 due to budgetary constraints.  Route 976 was renumbered to 612 on June 27, 2010 because it is not a contracted route. Route 966 was renumbered to 878 and 879 in October 2010, with 879 being discontinued in 2016.

Short turn terminals are not shown.

References

External links
New Jersey Transit - Bus

NJ Transit Bus Operations